Wing On is a department store company in Hong Kong.

The company is owned by a Hong Kong listed company Wing On Company International Limited, incorporated in Bermuda. The holding company of the listed company itself is Wing On International Holdings Limited, which is owned by Karl Kwok Chi Leung (郭志樑) and the Kwok family.

Until it was nationalised in 1966, Wing On's Shanghai branch was one of the "four great companies" of Shanghai.

History

Brothers James Gock Lock (Kwok Lok) (郭樂) and Philip Gock Chin (Kwok Chuen) (郭泉) started the Wing On fruit store in Australia in 1897. Wing On imported nuts, tea, rice, fireworks and ginger from China. The original "Wing On Building", located at 37 Ultimo Road in Haymarket, New South Wales, in Sydney's Chinatown, is now a hotel.

In 1907, James, Philip and their other brother William Gock Son (Kwok Sun) returned to Hong Kong with accumulated savings and founded the Wing on Company, the second Chinese-owned department store in Hong Kong. They expanded to Shanghai in 1918.

The Kwok brothers later went on to found Wing On Bank.

Stores in Hong Kong

It has four outlets in Hong Kong, after the closure of Taikoo Shing Store in 2015, with 310,000 square feet (33,400 square metres) of shopping space:
 Main Store: , 211 Des Voeux Road Central, Sheung Wan
 Wing on Plus (Nathan Road): Wing on Manulife Provident Funds Place, 345 Nathan Road, Jordan-Yau Ma Tei
 Wing on Plus (Tsim Sha Tsui East): Wing on Plaza, 62 Mody Road, Tsim Sha Tsui East
 Taikoo Shing Store: Cityplaza, Units 074 and 144, 18 Taikoo Shing Road, Taikoo Shing (closed after 2/8/2015, Eslite Store will take over its original location)
 Discovery Bay Store: Shop 114, Block C, Discovery Bay Plaza, Discovery Bay, Lantau Island

The branch at the Wing On Centre was prominently featured in the climactic sequence to the 1985 Jackie Chan film Police Story.

Wing On in Shanghai
Wing On also had a branch in Shanghai, opened in 1918 on Nanking (Nanjing) Road by the Kwok brothers with their cousin, George Kwok Bew, who had recently moved to Shanghai from Sydney. The Kwok brothers had initially worked for George's fruit and vegetable business, Wing Sang & Co., in Sydney before starting their own fruit and vegetable business.

Wing On was the second of the "Four Great Companies", which were large department stores modelled on Australian precedent established by Cantonese migrants returning from Australia. The Four Great Companies brought the model of modern department stores with egalitarian service pioneered by Anthony Hordern & Sons to Shanghai and quickly became the focal points of Shanghai's commercial district. Three of the "Four Great Companies" - Wing On, Sincere and The Sun, were founded by former partners of Wing Sang & Co.

The store occupied two prominent buildings. The distinctive original building stood opposite from the (then) Sincere Department Store. An extension was built next to it in the 1930s, one of the first modern "skyscrapers" of Shanghai. After the Communist revolution in China, the store was partnationalised in 1956, then fully nationalised in 1966 and renamed "East is Red Department Store", after which it was no longer connected to Wing On in Hong Kong and traded under various names. The 1930s extension building housed a separate "Overseas Chinese Store", which, for many years, was one of the few places in Shanghai where people with overseas connections could spend their foreign exchange certificates to buy goods not available to ordinary Chinese consumers.

In 2005, the department store in the original 1918 building resumed the Chinese version of the Wing On name. However, the store is owned by a separate company from Wing On, called "Yongan Department Store Co Ltd", a state-owned company. This company does not use the "Wing On" name in its English translations. The exterior of the original store was restored to its appearance during the Wing On period. However, the interior has been drastically refurbished. The store has also changed its market orientation, focusing almost exclusively on domestic Chinese branded clothing targeted at visitors from other parts of China, with a small department in watches and other accessories.

See also
 Wing On Bank
 Wing On House
 Wing On Street
 Shanghainese people in Hong Kong

References

 趣談今昔香港

External links

Wing On NETshop

Companies listed on the Hong Kong Stock Exchange
Department stores of Hong Kong
Former companies in the Hang Seng Index
Retail companies established in 1907
Retail companies of Hong Kong
Offshore companies of Bermuda
1907 establishments in Hong Kong